Bostan District is in Baharestan County, Tehran province, Iran. At the 2006 National Census, its population (as a part of Robat Karim County) was 168,753 in 39,410 households. The following census in 2011 counted 198,542 people in 53,604 households, by which time the district, together with Golestan District, had been separated from the county and Baharestan County established. At the latest census in 2016, the district had 229,603 inhabitants in 66,954 households.

References 

Baharestan County

Districts of Tehran Province

Populated places in Tehran Province

Populated places in Baharestan County